The 1945 Homestead hurricane was the most intense tropical cyclone to strike the U.S. state of Florida since 1935. The ninth tropical storm, third hurricane, and third major hurricane of the season, it developed east-northeast of the Leeward Islands on September 12. Moving briskly west-northwestward, the storm became a major hurricane on September 13. The system moved over the Turks and Caicos Islands the following day and then Andros on September 15. Later that day, the storm peaked as a Category 4 hurricane on the modern-day Saffir–Simpson scale with winds of 130 mph (215 km/h). Late on September 15, the hurricane made landfall on Key Largo and then in southern Dade County, Florida.

Thereafter, the hurricane began to weaken while moving across Florida, falling to Category 1 intensity only several hours after landfall late on September 15. Eventually, it curved north-northeastward and approached the east coast of Florida again. Late on September 16, the storm emerged into the Atlantic near St. Augustine and weakened to a tropical storm early on the following day. The cyclone made another landfall near the Georgia-South Carolina state line later on September 17. The system continued to weaken and transitioned into an extratropical cyclone near the border of North Carolina and Virginia early on September 18.

The storm caused significant damage and 22 deaths in the Turks and Caicos Islands and the Bahamas. In Florida, the hardest hit area was Miami-Dade County. Most of the city of Homestead was destroyed, while at the Naval Air Station Richmond, a fire ignited during the storm burned down three hangars worth $3 million (1945 USD) each. Throughout the state, the strong winds destroyed 1,632 residences and damaged 5,372 homes others. Four people died, including the fire chief of the Richmond station. In the Carolinas, the storm produced heavy rainfall, causing flash flooding, particularly along the Cape Fear River in North Carolina. Overall, the hurricane resulted in 26 fatalities and about $60 million in damage.

Meteorological history

After passing north of Hispaniola, the hurricane turned moved toward the Bahamas, approaching or passing over Grand Turk Island at 05:30 UTC on September 14. While moving through the Bahamas, the hurricane turned more to the northwest. It was a smaller than average storm, and continued intensifying while moving toward southeastern Florida.

At 19:30 UTC on September 15, the hurricane made landfall on Key Largo, and about a half hour later struck the Florida mainland. This estimate was substantiated by a gust  at Carysfort Reef Light, on the weaker side of the storm. The hurricane weakened over Florida while curving to the north and north-northeast, although the proximity to water and the passage over the Everglades limited substantial weakening. Hurricane-force winds spread across much of Florida until the storm emerged into the western Atlantic near St. Augustine late on September 16. At around 00:00 UTC the next day, the hurricane weakened to tropical storm status.

After continuing through the southeast United States, the storm became extratropical near the border of North Carolina and Virginia midday on September 18. Although it initially maintained tropical storm-force winds, the former hurricane weakened below gale-force on September 19 while it was near Philadelphia. The storm continued rapidly to the northeast, moving through New England and along the coast of Maine before turning more to the east. Late on September 19, the storm moved across Nova Scotia, passing southeast of Newfoundland the next day. It was last observed late on September 20 dissipating to the east of Newfoundland.

Preparations
Although hurricane warnings were initially issued for the Leeward Islands, the cyclone passed north of the Lesser Antilles. In advance of the storm, aircraft were evacuated from the Naval Air Station in Miami, Florida, where hundreds of planes left vulnerable locations. Residents were advised to heed advisories in Florida, the Bahamas, and northern Cuba. On September 15, hurricane-force winds were expected to affect areas from Fort Lauderdale, Florida, through the Florida Keys, and hurricane warnings were accordingly released for this region. Storm warnings also extended north to Melbourne and Tampa. Military personnel sought shelter at Hialeah Race Track, while residents boarded homes and evacuated from coastal areas to public structures. Boats were utilized to transport people from barrier islands, and small watercraft were secured along the Miami River. However, Grady Norton, the head of the United States Weather Bureau, stated before the storm that Miami would "miss the worst of it". The American Red Cross reported that 25,000 people sought shelter within their services during the storm. Local officials from Cape Hatteras, North Carolina, to Brunswick, Georgia, ordered evacuations for coastal locations.

Impact
In the Bahamas and Turks and Caicos Islands, 22 people were killed. The hurricane demolished three-quarters of the structures on Grand Turk Island, while the remaining intact buildings were damaged. The cyclone also produced heavy damage on Long Island, though damages were not reported in Nassau. Peak gusts were estimated near  in Nassau. After the storm, The Daily Gleaner initiated a fund to offer aid for residents in the Turks and Caicos Islands.

In South Florida, peak gusts were estimated near  at the Army Air Base in Homestead. The strong winds destroyed 1,632 residences across the state, while 5,372 homes received damages. In Miami, gusts reached , and damages were minimal, mostly snapped power lines, compared to communities in southern Dade County. Nearly 200 people were injured at the Naval Air Station (NAS) Richmond, when a fire ignited during the storm, affecting three hangars worth $3 million each and destroying 25 blimps, 366 planes, and 150 automobiles. On this basis maximum sustained winds at the base were believed to have exceeded , equivalent to low-end Category 5 status on the Saffir–Simpson scale, but these values were not officially accepted. Steel-framed doors at the NAS incurred structural deformation, which engineers deemed to be consistent with sustained winds of —an estimate later incorporated into a reanalysis of the storm. Damages to the Miami area was estimated at $40 million. An additional fire also destroyed a furniture factory and a tile manufacturing plant in the northwestern portion of downtown Miami. One death was reported in the area, the fire chief of Richmond's fire department, and 26 required hospitalization. Another death was recorded after a schooner ran aground in present-day Bal Harbour, Florida, killing its chief engineer.

Homestead was mostly flooded underwater, with the first floor of city hall and the fire department completely flooded and nearly all its residences destroyed. The historical Horde Hardware building collapsed while a local church was flatted by the winds. Unofficially winds at Homestead Army Air Corps Base reached , virtually destroying the airbase. Numerous structures were flattened, including the base exchange, the nurses' dormitory, and enlisted housing facilities. Building 741, the so-called "Big Hangar", was unroofed. The fire station and base laundry were deemed irrepairable. The few aircraft left intact were reportedly "tossed about like leaves." In the Florida Keys, hundreds of residences were damaged. The Florida East Coast Railway station at Goulds collapsed. Crop losses was estimated to be $4 million and most of its avocado harvest was destroyed. Four people died across the state.

Minor reports of damage was reported in Central and Northern Florida, with St. Augustine reporting a  wind gust. In Charleston, South Carolina, strong winds caused high waves, but the storm arrived at low tide and produced modest damage. In Aiken, South Carolina, heavy precipitation caused damage to unpaved streets. This rain led to saturated grounds, allowing new water to spill into streams. Many crop fields and dwellings were flooded near the Cape Fear River as levels rose to record heights. The towns of Moncure, Fayetteville, and Elizabethtown exceeded flood stage levels. Broken dams in Richmond County produced significant flash floods. Few deaths were reported, but economic losses were extensive.

Aftermath

In the aftermath of the storm, more than 1,000 Red Cross workers were activated in response to the cyclone. A force of 400 German prisoners of war and 200 Bahamian laborers participated in the cleanup process.

See also

List of Florida hurricanes

References

Bibliography

External links
"Hurricane Sweeps US East Coast", United Newsreel Corporation (1945)

Homestead
1945 Homestead
1945 Homestead
1945 Homestead
1945 meteorology
1945 natural disasters in the United States
1945 in Florida
September 1945 events in the United States